This is the complete list of Pan American Games medalists in gymnastics from 1951 to 2019.

Artistic gymnastics

Men's events

Men's team all-around

Men's individual all-around

Men's floor exercise

Men's pommel horse

Men's still rings

Men's vault

Men's parallel bars

Men's horizontal bar

Men's team floor exercise

Men's team pommel horse

Men's team still rings

Men's team vault

Men's team parallel bars

Men's team horizontal bar

Women's events

Women's team all-around

Women's individual all-around

Women's vault

Women's uneven bars

Women's balance beam

Women's floor exercise

Club swinging

Men's club swinging

Rhythmic gymnastics

Team all-around

Group all-around

Group single apparatus

Group multiple apparatus

Individual all-around

Individual rope

Individual hoop

Individual clubs

Individual ribbon

Individual ball

Rope climbing

Men's rope climbing

Trampoline and tumbling

Men's individual trampoline

Men's individual tumbling

Women's individual trampoline

References

Gymnastics
Pan American